William of Poitiers ( 10201090) (LA: Guillelmus Pictaviensis; FR: Guillaume de Poitiers) was a Frankish priest of Norman origin and chaplain of Duke William of Normandy (William the Conqueror), for whom he chronicled the Norman Conquest of England in his Gesta Willelmi ducis Normannorum et regis Anglorum ("The Deeds of William, Duke of the Normans and King of the English") or Gesta Guillelmi II ducis Normannorum. He had trained as a soldier before taking holy orders.

Life
Little is known about William of Poitiers, with most information coming from Orderic Vitalis in his Historia Ecclesiactica, written in 1114–1115 and 1125. He was apparently born in Les Préaux, France, near Pont-Audemer to an influential knightly Norman family, probably about 1020. According to Orderic, William originally trained as a knight, which gave him a much greater insight into the details of war than the typical medieval clerical writer. About 1049 he decided to enter the church, turning away from his knightly duties. Once he turned to the priesthood, William studied at the renowned school of Saint Hilaire-le-Grand in Poitiers and was said by Orderic to have returned to Normandy 'more learned than all his friends and neighbours'.

William was given positions of ecclesiastical authority, becoming chaplain to Duke William and archdeacon of Lisieux. However, he doesn't appear in any ecclesiastical or royal and ducal charters as might be expected from someone of such a position, which perhaps casts doubts over Orderic's account of William of Poitiers life.
Little is known about his old age, and he probably retired into a religious house, or possibly political disgrace. This is implied by Orderic's statement that William of Poitiers was forced to stop writing his history of William the Conqueror due to ″unfavorable circumstances″, of which we do not know the nature. Possible links between William of Poitiers and Duke William's rebellious son Robert can be found, and may therefore provide an explanation for this.

Gesta Guillelmi
William of Poitiers wrote the Gesta Guillelmi some time after 1066. It tells the story of how Duke William prepared for, and achieved, the Conquest of England. It also justifies William's succession to the English throne. The bulk of the writing probably took place between 1071 and 1077.

The Gesta Guillelmi is the earliest extended biography of any Duke of Normandy, and is an invaluable source for the Battle of Hastings in 1066. William of Poitiers was well placed to write the Gesta Guillelmi, being both trained as a military knight and serving as a chaplain within Duke William's household.
 
There are no surviving manuscripts of the 'Gesta Guillemi'. André Duchesne published an edition in 1619, although even his (now lost) manuscript was missing its beginning and end. Its present form covers the period from 1047 to 1068, and both starts and finishes mid-sentence. There is also some retrospective material concerning affairs in England after Cnut's death (1035). Orderic Vitalis says that it originally finished in 1071. The Gesta Guillelmi is most valuable as a source for the Battle of Hastings, probably based on first hand oral evidence.

The 'History' also serves as a panegyric to William the Conqueror. R. Allen Brown writes: "Within the panegyric there is a wealth of facts and details... most derived from personal knowledge and personal contacts, compiled and intelligently put together by a man uniquely qualified as both clerk and knight, closely connected with the court ... One may add that William of Poitiers must have known his hero from their joint youth up, and stress that as both former knight and former chaplain of the duke he is able to bring us closer to the heart of Normandy in the mid-eleventh century than any other writer of that age or later."

Critiques of the Gesta Guillelmi
William of Poitiers undoubtedly thought of himself as an historian. He mentions in the Gesta Guillelmi that the duty of a historian is to remain within the 'bounds of the truth.'; but he failed to obey this rule. Antonia Gransden in 'Historical writing in England c. 550 to c. 1307' shows that William of Poitiers was just as much a panegyrist as a historian. She summarises Gesta Guillelmi as 'biased, unreliable account of events, and unrealistic portraits of the two principle protagonists.' Moreover, Orderic Vitalis, who uses the Gesta Guillelmi as his principal source in creating his 'Ecclesiastical History', chooses to omit or contradict many of Poitiers' passages in the Guesta Guillelmi, including denial of King William's mercy to the conquered English; having been brought up in England from 1075–1085, Orderic knew better. However, the Gesta Guillelmi cannot be dismissed; most of the panegyrical passages are easy to isolate, and there is a lot of material that William of Poitiers probably reports accurately.

Importance

William of Poitier is largely known as a key figure in the study of the Norman conquest due to 'Gesta Guillelmi'. He describes his own life while also outlining the events of the Norman conquest, the greatest significance of the source is the large focus on military tactics which only a figure who has served as a knight could appreciate. William of Poitier offers an insight which is not addressed in other contemporary texts such as the Anglo-Saxon chronicle.
As a figure himself William of Poitiers offers an example of social mobility from a knight to taking holy orders. Furthermore, Poitier was so close to Duke William that he has a closer view of Norman actions, this justifies the wide usage of the source as a key factor in studying 1066 and the Norman conquest in general.

What it tells us

Anglo-Saxon society
William of Poitiers details the life of Duke William. Nonetheless, there are a few major insights into pre-Conquest Anglo-Saxon society. For example, William of Poitiers reports that a Danish raiding party returned from England with 'great booty'. Furthermore, Harold is said to have had 'abundant treasure with which to tempt dukes'. This may explain the numerous attacks England suffered during the 10thearly 11th century.
William of Poitiers believed that the pre-Conquest English 'all showed love of their country', suggesting some sort of national identity that was lacking in Normandy.

Norman society
William of Poitiers provides a picture of Norman France prior to 1066. The various rebellions Duke William faced in his early reign are detailed in what was a fractured Duchy. The local Norman lords constantly waging private wars contrasts with the relatively stable Anglo-Saxon Kingdom across the Channel. The domestic turbulence forced Duke William to confront and subdue his nobility, sometimes by co-operation than coercion; for example, despite revolting against Duke William, the Gesta Guillemi states that Guy of Burgundy was allowed to remain in his court.
William of Poitiers shows that the Norman castle was an important element of society. An effective Duke could use them as strategic power bases, stamping their authority on the rural Duchy; however, a castle could also be a rallying point for rebellious nobles. William of Poitiers reports many a ducal siege as a result.

Medieval literary tradition
As a eulogising text, William of Poitiers's history constantly highlights William's admirable qualities, for example that the Duke 'excelled in intelligence, assiduity, and strength'. For William of Poitiers, Duke William embodies the perfect ideals of knighthood, as illustrated by improbable stories scattered through his history; for example he states that William, with 50 of his knights, fought and bested a force of 1000. This represents a clear exaggeration. 
William of Poitiers also relates Duke William's exploits to those of the Greek and Roman world. For example, there is a lengthy comparison between William and Caesar's conquest of Britain. Not only was this done to flatter Duke William but also shows William of Poitiers' own knowledge.

Battle of Hastings
The Gesta Guillelmi provides the traditional narrative of the Battle of Hastings. William of Poitiers gives detailed descriptions of the composition of both the Norman and Anglo Saxon armies. Furthermore, he describes the famous 'feigned flight' manoeuvre.

References

Primary sources
William of Poitiers, Gesta Guillelmi, ed. and tr.  Modern edition, with English translation and commentary. Earlier editions include:
 Edition, with modern French translation.

Orderic Vitalis, Historia ecclesiastica, ed. and tr. 

1020s births
1090 deaths
11th-century French historians
11th-century Normans
Norman conquest of England
11th-century English historians
11th-century Latin writers